Ferenc Czvikovszki (1 January 1932 – 16 November 2021) was a Hungarian fencer. He competed in the team foil event at the 1960 Summer Olympics. He died in November 2021, at the age of 89.

References

External links
 

1932 births
2021 deaths
Hungarian male foil fencers
Olympic fencers of Hungary
Fencers at the 1960 Summer Olympics
Martial artists from Budapest
20th-century Hungarian people